Mongolia competed at the 1980 Winter Olympics in Lake Placid, United States.  The nation returned to the Winter Games after having missed the 1976 Winter Olympics.

Cross-country skiing

Men

Speed skating

Men

References
Official Olympic Reports
 Olympic Winter Games 1980, full results by sports-reference.com

Nations at the 1980 Winter Olympics
1980 Winter Olympics
Oly